Lewis Charnock (Born ) is an English former rugby league footballer who last played as a  or  for the Swinton Lions in the RFL League 1. He has previously played for Oldham Roughyeds (Heritage № 1419) in the Betfred Championship and for St. Helens (Heritage № 1205) in the Super League.
Upon retirement from playing, he joined the coaching staff of Woolston Rovers Community Club in December 2022.

Club career

St Helens
Charnock made his St Helens début against the Salford City Reds on 22 March 2013 and kicked three goals. After failing to appear in the first team in 2014, Charnock made a further three appearances in 2015, scoring his first two tries for the club in a win over Wakefield Trinity.

Bradford Bulls
In 2016 Charnock signed a loan deal with the Bradford Bulls of the Championship.

He featured in round 5 against Oldham and in round 17 against Workington Town.  He then featured in the round 19 match against Halifax then in round 21 against Whitehaven. Charnock played in round 23 against Featherstone Rovers. Charnock played in the Championship Shield Game 1 against Whitehaven to Game 2 Halifax then in Game 7 Sheffield to the final against the same opponent.

Barrow Raiders
Charnock joined Barrow for the 2017 season.

Oldham
On 29 October 2019 it was announced that Charnock had signed for Oldham on a two-year deal.

Swinton Lions
On 12 November 2021, it was reported that he had signed for Swinton in the RFL League 1.

References

External links
Zero Tackle profile
Saints Heritage Society profile

1994 births
Living people
Barrow Raiders players
Bradford Bulls players
English rugby league coaches
English rugby league players
Leigh Leopards players
Oldham R.L.F.C. players
Rochdale Hornets players
Rugby league halfbacks
Rugby league players from Warrington
St Helens R.F.C. players
Swinton Lions players